James Tate may refer to:

 James Tate (headmaster) (1771–1843), headmaster of Richmond School, 1796–1833
 James "Honest Dick" Tate (1831–?), State Treasurer of Kentucky
 James Hugh Joseph Tate (1910–1983), Irish-American politician, mayor of Philadelphia
 James W. Tate (1875–1922), songwriter, accompanist, and composer
 James Tate (writer) (1943–2015), poet
 James Tate, murderer involved in the 2003 John McDonogh High School shooting
 James Tate (Emmerdale), a fictional character on the soap opera Emmerdale

See also

 Jim Tait (c. 1935–2011), football coach